The Lava Creek Tuff is a tuff formation in Wyoming, Montana and Idaho, United States, created during the Lava Creek eruption around 630,000 years ago, which formed the Yellowstone Caldera.

The tuff has been exposed by erosion at Tuff Cliff along the Gibbon River.

Lava Creek Tuff ranges in color from light gray to pale red in some locales. Rock texture of the tuff ranges from fine-grained to aphanitic and is densely welded.

See also
Snake River Plain
Island Park Caldera
Henry's Fork Caldera

References

Landforms of Yellowstone National Park
Geologic formations of Wyoming
Volcanism of Wyoming
Geologic formations of Idaho
Volcanology
Tuff formations
Yellowstone Caldera
VEI-8 eruptions
Pleistocene volcanism
Volcanic eruptions in the United States
Plinian eruptions